Hans-Georg is a given name. Notable people with the name include:

Hans-Georg Anscheidt (born 1935), Grand Prix motorcycle road racing World Champion
Hans Georg von Arnim-Boitzenburg (1583–1641), Field Marshal of Holy Roman Empire and the Electorate of Saxony, diplomat, and politician
Hans-Georg Aschenbach (born 1951), former East German ski jumper
Hans-Georg Backhaus (born 1929), German economist and philosopher
Hans Georg Berger, German-born photographer and writer who lives in Elba and in Laos
Hans-Georg Beyer (born 1956), former East German handball player who competed in the 1980 Summer Olympics
Hans Georg Bock (born 1948), German university professor for mathematics and scientific computing
Hans-Georg Bohle, German geographer and development researcher
Hans-Georg Borck (1921–2011), highly decorated Hauptmann in the Wehrmacht during World War II
Hans-Georg Bürger (1952–1980), racing driver from West Germany
Hans Georg Calmeyer (1903–1972), German lawyer who saved thousands of Jews from certain death during 1941 to 1945
Hans-Georg von Charpentier, Sturmbannführer (Major) in the Waffen SS during World War II
Hans-Georg Dallmer (born 1942), former East German pair skater who competed with partner Irene Müller
Hans Georg Dehmelt (born 1922), German-born American physicist, co-developer of the ion trap technique
Hans-Georg Dreßen (born 1964), retired German football player
Hans-Georg Dulz (born 1936), retired German football player
Hans Georg Feichtinger (born 1951), Austrian mathematician
Hans-Georg von Friedeburg (1895–1945), the deputy commander of the U-Boat Forces of Nazi Germany
Hans-Georg Gadamer (1900–2002), German philosopher of the continental tradition, best known for his 1960 work Truth and Method
Hans Georg Friedrich Groß, (1860–1924), German balloonist and airship constructor
Hans-Georg Herzog (1912–1959), highly decorated Oberstleutnant der Reserve in the Wehrmacht during World War II
Hans Georg Herzog (born 1915), Romanian field handball player of German origin who competed in the 1936 Summer Olympics
Hans-Georg Hess (1923–2008), German U-boat commander of the Second World War
Hans-Georg Jaunich (born 1951), former East German handball player who competed in the 1980 Summer Olympics
Hans-Georg Jörger (born 1903), German Olympic fencer
Hans Georg Klamroth (1898–1944), involved in the 20 July Plot to assassinate Adolf Hitler
Hans-Georg Kraus (born 1949), former professional German footballer
Hans-Georg Leyser (1896–1980), highly decorated Generalmajor in the Wehrmacht during World War II
Hans-Georg von der Marwitz, World War I flying ace credited with 15 aerial victories
Hans-Georg Moldenhauer (born 1941), former football goalkeeper
Hans Georg Nägeli (1773–1836), composer and music publisher
Hans-Georg von der Osten began his career as a World War I flying ace credited with five aerial victories
Hans-Georg Panczak (born 1952), German television actor and voice actor
Hans Georg Rupp (1907–1989), German judge
Hans-Georg Schierholz (1921–1986), highly decorated Oberfeldwebel in the Luftwaffe during World War II
Hans-Georg Schwarzenbeck (born 1948), retired German football player
Hans-Georg von Seidel (1891–1955), German military leader in the German Army during World War I and in the Luftwaffe during World War II
Hans Georg Jacob Stang (minister of defence) (1858–1907), the Norwegian Minister of Defence 1900–1902 and 1902–1903
Hans Georg Jacob Stang (prime minister) (1830–1907), the Norwegian Prime Minister in Stockholm 1888–1889
Hans Georg Stehlin (1870–1941), Swiss paleontologist and geologist
Hans-Georg Stephan (born 1950), German university professor specializing in European medieval archaeology and post-medieval archaeology
Hans-Georg Stümke (1941–2002), German author, teacher, historian and publisher
Hans-Georg Tersling (1857–1920), Danish architect who lived and worked for most of his life on the French Riviera
Hans Georg Vaupel (born 1934), German sculptor